The World Cell Race is a competition among labs to see which cell type can travel 600 microns the fastest. The idea is to promote research into how to make cells move faster to aid immune system response or slow metastatic cancers. A fork with a dead end was added to the course in 2013 to assess responses to growth-factor protein. The race was broadcast live online.  A Dicty World Race "to "find the fastest and smartest Dicty cells" is scheduled to take place May 16, 2014 in Boston.

References

External links
World Cell Race 2014 website
World Cell Race 2013 website
World Cell Race 2012 website

Cell movement
Chemistry experiments
Cancer research